"O Salutaris Hostia" (Latin, "O Saving Victim" or "O Saving Sacrifice") is a section of one of the Eucharistic hymns written by Thomas Aquinas for the Feast of Corpus Christi. He wrote it for the Hour of Lauds in the Divine Office. It is actually the last two stanzas of the hymn Verbum supernum prodiens, and is used for the Adoration of the Blessed Sacrament. The other two hymns written by Aquinas for the Feast contain the famous sections Panis angelicus and Tantum ergo.

Text

Local usage
As a liturgical text, the hymn is usually sung in Latin. There are however some cases in which it is found sung in the vernacular.

In Notre Dame, Paris, France a middle stanza is inserted, localising the text:

A verse rendering of the song is used during the Wednesday Novena Service to Our Lady of Perpetual Help in Baclaran Church, Parañaque, Philippines. Rev. Teofilo Vinteres, C.Ss.R and Alfredo Buenavista are credited with the music and the arrangement, respectively, and both also produced a Filipino translation, Handóg na Tagapágligtás ("Sacrificial Saviour"):

Musical settings 

Marc-Antoine Charpentier composed six settings for "O salutaris Hostia": H.236 (1670), H.262 (1690), H.261 (1690), H.36 (1690), H.248 (1679–80), and H.249 (1681). Gioachino Rossini included the hymn as a movement in his Petite messe solennelle. Both stanzas are retained in Arthur Honegger's 1939 setting for mezzo-soprano and piano, whereas only the first stanza is included in Vytautas Miškinis' setting for mixed choir a cappella, O salutaris hostia, in 1991. The first stanza is also inserted as part of the Sanctus of Robert Schumann's Mass in C minor, Op. posth. 147 (1852–53). David Conte included the hymn as the first movement of his Two Hymns in Honor of the Blessed Sacrament (2005).

References

External links 
 
 Sheet Music at Hymnary

Eucharistic devotions
Latin-language Christian hymns